Fox 8 may refer to:

Television stations in the United States

Current
KJUD-DT3, a digital subchannel of KJUD in Juneau, Alaska
WAGM-DT2, a digital subchannel of WAGM-TV in Presque Isle, Maine 
WCHS-DT2, a digital subchannel of WCHS-TV in Charleston, West Virginia
WGHP in High Point, North Carolina
WJW in Cleveland, Ohio
WLIO-DT2, a digital subchannel of WLIO in Lima, Ohio
WVUE-DT in New Orleans, Louisiana
WWCP-TV in Johnstown, Pennsylvania

Former
WFXI, Morehead City, North Carolina (1989-2017)

Other uses
Fox8, a general entertainment channel in Australia owned by Foxtel Management Pty Ltd
Veronica TV, a Dutch television channel formerly known as Fox 8 when it was owned by News Corporation
A 2013 short story written by George Saunders